Garbis is a given name and a surname. People so named include:

 Garbis Aprikian
 Garbis Kortian
 Garbis Zakaryan
 Garbis İstanbulluoğlu
 Marvin J. Garbis
 Alexander Garbis
 Victor of Garbis

See also
 Garbi (disambiguation)
 Edgar Garbisch

Armenian given names